Original 21 is the name of the association which consists of many supporters groups of the Greek multi-sports club AEK Athletic Club. Officially founded in 1982, Original 21 is the biggest supporters' union of AEK. Original 21 has members from all over Greece and has over the years become a part of the club by affecting club decisions and by following the club on all possible occasions.

Background 

After the fall of the dictatorship, Greek society was dominated by the demand for the active participation of citizens in all political and social sectors. In this context, fan associations were also created.

One of them was the first organized association of AEK fans with the name Gate 21, founded in 1975. The name came from the corresponding entrance of the Nikos Goumas Stadium where the most passionate supporters of the team gathered. In a way similar to a political party, which is organized with the axes of reference of the offices of local organizations, Gate 21 started its operation by renting an underground space in the area of Agios Nikolaos, Attica. The area was just four train stops from the Nikos Goumas Stadium. The meetings of its members took place there. However, internal conflicts over the organization's action and orientation soon became apparent. Thus, in 1982 Gate 21 was split. The members who supported a more active presence in the life of the group left and founded the Genuine Gate 21, the Original 21, led by Dimitris Hatzichristos, who gradually developed into a leading figure and a key exponent of the association.

History

Origins 

Original 21 was created in 1975, as Gate 21, taking its name from Gate 21 of the Nikos Goumas Stadium, in Nea Filadelfeia, from where its hardcore fans watched the team's games. From 1982, when a second stand molding was constructed on the opposite door doors of Gate 21 (9–11) and after it was split from Gate 21, the "seat" of the Original 21 was moved to those doors, henceforth known as "Skepasti". The name of Original 21 comes from the translation of "Genuine Gate 21".

After the demolition of the historic stadium of AEK in 2003, and the use of the Olympic Stadium of Athens, the association has made its "headquarters" one of the two horses, that at Gates 1–35, just opposite the other Horseshoe of the stadium, at gate 21. It has a total of 60 sub-links in various parts of the world, in Greece, Cyprus, London and two important Greek communities in Australia, Sydney and Melbourne. The "central" club and headquarters of the organization is the so-called "Domatiaki" in the Square of the Argentine Republic, in the area of Alexandras Avenue, near the Panathinaikos stadium.

Today 
A historic moment in the course of the organization was the departure of its natural leader, Dimitris Hatzichristos, who left its ranks with the relegation of AEK FC in 2013. Since then, Original 21 has not had a person who can be described as the leader of the organization.

Friendships 

A so-called "triangle of brotherhood" has developed between the largest left-wing fan clubs of AEK, Marseille and Livorno. The connection is mostly an ideological one.
Also, AEK's and St. Pauli's left-wing fans, have a strong friendship and their connection is mostly for ideological reasons.

See also 
 AEK Athletic Club

References

AEK (sports club)
Football in Greece
Association football hooligan firms
Association football culture
Greek association football supporters' associations
Ultras groups
1982 establishments in Greece